Pistacia atlantica  is a species of pistachio tree known by the English common name Mt. Atlas mastic tree, Atlas pistachio, Atlantic pistacio, Atlantic terebinth, Cyprus turpentine tree, and Persian turpentine tree.

P. atlantica has three subspecies or varieties which have been described as atlantica, cabulica, and mutica. According to molecular phylogenetic studies, P. atlantica subsp. kurdica is actually a separate species, Pistacia eurycarpa.

Names
In Iran it is called baneh or wild pistachio tree. In Tamazight, it is known as Tijjeɣt. In the Canary Islands it is known as Almacigo, and in Arabic it is called  (buṭm or buṭum). In southern Iran, in Bandar-Abbas in Hormozgān Province, it is called  kasoudang and in Bushehr it is called  kolkhong. In Turkey it is commonly known as  melengiç. In Kurdish the tree is called darwan or daraban, and the seed is called qezwan. In Pashto it is called Shanna.And in Balochi it is called Gowan.

Description

The trunk is stout and covered in fissured bark. The leaves are pinnate, each with seven to 9 lance-shaped leaflets.

The leaves and branches often have galls when the tree is infested with gall-producing species of aphids, including Pemphigus utricularis, Slavum wertheimae, and Forda riccobonii.

The tree is dioecious with male and female trees producing different types of flowers. Both types are small and greenish and fall away quickly. Monoecious and hermaphrodite trees have been seen, but are unusual. It grows slowly, and can reach 1000 years old. It has broken bark with ashen gray color. Older branches have the same design, fractured and ash color, which gives the tree a grizzled look. The leaves are oval, almost sessile, shining above, and dark green, with seven to 9 leaflets, imparipinnate with petioles a little winged, flowers in racemes lax, the male and female on different trees.

The flowers are unisexual, small, discreet green, thick as pea fruit, then changing to reddish blue.
In colder areas the leaves in May check and fall in November. Though dioecious, in some communities males dominate the female specimens in number. It grows in oak woodlands and oak sclerophyllus. The fruits ripen from July to October, starting to bear fruit at the age of eight to 10 years, with abundant fruit after two to three years.

Distribution
It is native to a section of Eurasia from North Africa to the Iranian Plateau, where it was once common. Because other trees were rare, it was the only good source of wood and was overharvested, reducing its current distribution. It is a common tree in mountain forests in Iran, and it is "characteristic" of the landscape in parts of Algeria outside the Sahara.

The almacigo is a tree that extends from the North Africa and found in thermophilous forests, up to 600 m altitude. It is one of the few deciduous species native to the Canary archipelago.
It is native of Eurasia, the Iranian Plateau, to northern Africa.
Azerbaijan (Soltanbud forest)

Uses

There are many uses for this plant. This wild pistachio is the most economically important tree in many parts of Iran, including the Zagros Mountains, where it is managed as a valuable forest tree. The resin and fruit oil were historically used for a variety of medicinal purposes. The resin, known in Iran as saqez, is still an important commodity.

An important use is to combat soil erosion. It strengthens the soil, and is used for reforestation of arid and steep slopes and against landslides. It is stronger than Pistacia terebinthus, where it is used as rootstock in Ukraine and the United States for growing Pistacia vera, but resists frost better than P. terebinthus.

The resin is used to manufacture alcohol and lacquer. Its essential oils are used in perfume industry. The leaves are rich in tannins, up to 20% in the galls caused by an aphid parasite, used as the raw material for tanning in the leather industry.  The sap is dried and used as incense, and its smoke releases a pleasant smell to the local environment for celebrations and religious ceremonies, as "incense". The tannins from the galls were used for tanning.

Food
The pistachio fruits are a food source in the area, but the more commonly cultivated pistachio tree P. vera is more valuable for food production. The seeds, like pistachio, are edible oil seeds, like nuts, and contain up to 60% fat. Candy made with P. atlantica in Turkish are called tsukpi pistachio. Sometimes, the immature fruit is harvested and eaten with sour milk. The plant contains a resin, used as chewing gum in Kevan, Turkey, where it is called kevove rubber tree.

The resin of the tree is called Cyprus turpentine or Cyprus balsam and used to make chewing gum in Cyprus. It has been reported to have significant antimicrobial and antifungal activity. Twenty-six compounds in hexane extract were identified. The major compounds were α-pinene 57.06%, β-pinene 9.83%, trans-pinocarveol 2.95%, trans-Verbenol 3.97%, α-Phellandren-8-ol 3.81%.

It is used in a food in Fars province in Iran, named "OuBanneh" (اوبنه).

The raw fruits of the wild pistachio are not favored as food and are said to taste like turpentine. They are about 45% oil.

Cultivation
Pistacia atlantica is planted as an ornamental shadebearing and drought-tolerant landscape tree in gardens and parks. In California it is imported to use as rootstock for cultivated pistachio trees (Pistacia vera). Both introductions have led to its escape and current status as an occasional invasive species in California.

See also
Pistacia eurycarpa, used to be P. atlantica subsp. kurdica
Pistacia lentiscus, the true mastic tree

References

atlantica
Flora of the Canary Islands
Flora of temperate Asia
Flora of North Africa
Flora of Malta
Flora of Yemen
Trees of Mediterranean climate
Medicinal plants
Garden plants of Africa
Ornamental trees
Flora of the Mediterranean Basin